{{DISPLAYTITLE:C15H21N3O}}
The molecular formula C15H21N3O (molar mass: 259.35 g/mol, exact mass: 259.1685 u) may refer to:

 Primaquine
 GSK-789,472

Molecular formulas